Clubul Sportiv Avântul Valea Mărului, commonly known as Avântul Valea Mărului, is a Romanian professional football club based in Valea Mărului, Galați County, Romania.

History
Clubul Sportiv Avântul Valea Mărului was founded in 2011 and after only one season promoted to Liga IV – Galați County. The club won Liga IV three times then, first time they lost the promotion play-off match against Olimpia Râmnicu Sărat 1–7 on aggregate. Next season they won 7–2 on aggregate against Vaslui County champions, Pajura Huși, and promoted to Liga III for the first time in the club's history.

In their first Liga III season they finished on 5th place.

Avântul withdrew from Liga III during the winter break of the 2017–18 season, but continued its activity at youth level with the U-15 and U-13 squads. The club was enrolled in the Liga V at the start of the new season, 2018–19.

Ground

The club plays its home matches on Prof. Costică Popovici Stadium in Valea Mărului, with a capacity of 1,000 people.

Honours

Leagues
Liga IV – Galați County
Winners (3): 2014–15, 2015–16, 2019–20
Liga V – Galați County
Winners (2): 2012–13, 2018–19

Cups
Cupa României – Galați County
Winners (1): 2014–15

Other performances 
 3 season in Liga III

Players

First team squad

Out on loan

Club officials

Board of directors

Current technical staff

League history

References

External links

Association football clubs established in 2011
Football clubs in Galați County
Liga III clubs
Liga IV clubs
2011 establishments in Romania